The Brooklyn Lions were a National Football League team that played in the 1926 NFL season. The team was formed as the league's counter-move to the first American Football League, which enfranchised a team called the Brooklyn Horsemen, a professional football team that competed in the 1926 AFL season.

In the months before the regular season began, both leagues battled with each other for fan support and the right to play at Ebbets Field. The NFL emerged as the winner, as the Lions signed the lease to use the stadium on July 20.

On November 12, 1926, the Horsemen withdrew from the AFL and merged with Lions. The new team created by the merger was initially called the Brooklyn Lions and competed in the NFL from November 22, 1926. For the last three games of the 1926, the team used the Horsemen name to finish the season. After three consecutive losses by shutout, the merged team winked out of existence.

Brooklyn Lions (NFL)
Coached by Punk Berryman, the Lions featured Rex Thomas and Herm Bagby, two members of the backfield who could play either tailback or wingback. On defense, Thomas also snared four interceptions. Unfortunately, the team was only slightly more consistent in its play than the Horsemen, and after the November 7 game against the Kansas City Cowboys (a 10–9 loss at Ebbets Field), the Lions merged with the Horsemen. At the time of the merger, the Lions had compiled a 2–5 win–loss record.

NOTE: Final NFL standings: official franchise won–lost record combines the wins and losses of the Lions with the results of the games played by the merged team, originally named the Brooklyn Lions and later the Brooklyn Horsemen.

Brooklyn Horsemen (AFL)

The Horsemen of the first AFL were owned by boxing promoter Humbert Fugazy and played their home games in Brooklyn's Commercial Field. Coached by Eddie McNeely, the Horsemen got the team name after McNeely's signing of Elmer Layden and Harry Stuhldreher, two of Notre Dame's Four Horsemen. While the team's first game was decided by a 60-yard touchdown pass from Stuldreher to Ed Harrison, the team had trouble maintaining a steady offense (and, ultimately maintaining a fan base). After losses to the Los Angeles Wildcats and Boston Bulldogs in front of decreasing crowds, a scheduled game at Ebbets Field against league leader (and eventual champion) Philadelphia Quakers was cancelled due to inclement weather. On November 7, 1926, the Horsemen played their last AFL game, a 21–13 loss to the New York Yankees, and then merged with their NFL cousins, the Brooklyn Lions, to complete the season in the NFL.

"Horse-Lions": The Brooklyn Horsemen (NFL)

The result of the merger was derisively dubbed the Horse-Lions by the local media, but initially (November 14, 1926) the merged team played under the Brooklyn Lions banner. The new team, with eight members of the now-defunct AFL team, trounced the Canton Bulldogs 19–0 in front of a small crowd in Ebbets Field. In a last-ditch effort to attract paying fans, the Lions then adopted the Horsemen nickname of the old AFL team... and lost the last three games of their existence by shutout.

Horsemen who were also Lions
Eight men played for both the Horsemen in the AFL and the Lions/Horsemen in the NFL:

Fullback Earl Britton
End Ted Drews
End Ed Harrison
Guard Red Howard
Center Ted Plumridge
Tailback Harry Stuhldreher
Guard Tarzan Taylor

In addition, guard Hec Garvey was on the rosters of no fewer than four teams in the AFL or NFL in 1926: the Hartford Blues (NFL), the Horsemen (AFL), the Lions (NFL), and the New York Yankees.

References

Defunct National Football League teams
Defunct American football teams in New York City
American Football League (1926) teams
American football teams established in 1926
American football teams disestablished in 1926
 
Brooklyn
Sports in Brooklyn
1926 establishments in New York City
1926 disestablishments in New York (state)